The Milan belt railway is a semicircular railway in Milan, Italy. It links the railway lines converging on the city with each other and the Milano Centrale station.

The belt railway was built during the reorganisation of the Milan railway junction, completed in 1931. It replaced an older belt line, which formed a complete ring; only part of the southern section of the old line remains in service.

See also 
 List of railway lines in Italy

References

External links

Railway lines in Lombardy
Transport in Milan